The following are the national records in Olympic weightlifting in South Africa. Records are maintained in each weight class for the snatch lift, clean and jerk lift, and the total for both lifts by the South African Weightlifting Federation.

Men

Women

References

South Africa
records
weightlifting
weightlifting